Frederick Clement Stevens (January 1, 1861 – July 1, 1923) was a U.S. Representative from Minnesota.

Early life
Stevens was born in Boston, Massachusetts. He moved with his parents to Searsport, Maine and attended the common schools of Rockland, Maine. He graduated from Bowdoin College in Brunswick, Maine in 1881, and read law in Bangor, Maine. Stevens graduated from the law department of the University of Iowa at Iowa City in 1884.
 He was 
admitted to the bar in 1884 and commenced practice in St. Paul, Minnesota.

Career
Stevens was a member of the Minnesota House of Representatives 1888 – 1891; elected as a Republican to the 55th, 56th, 57th, 58th, 59th, 60th, 61st, 62nd, and 63rd congresses, (March 4, 1897 – March 3, 1915). In 1914, he was the principal Republican spokesman in the House of Representatives for the bill that ultimately was enacted as the Federal Trade Commission Act.  He was an unsuccessful candidate for reelection in 1914 to the 64th congress.

Death
Stevens engaged in the practice of law until his death in St. Paul, Minnesota. He is interred at Oakland Cemetery in St. Paul.

References

Further reading
Progressive Men of Minnesota (Minneapolis, 1897), p. 33

External links

 
Minnesota Legislators Past and Present

Republican Party members of the Minnesota House of Representatives
Bowdoin College alumni
Politicians from Boston
People from Searsport, Maine
Politicians from Bangor, Maine
Politicians from Saint Paul, Minnesota
1861 births
1923 deaths
University of Iowa College of Law alumni
Minnesota lawyers
Republican Party members of the United States House of Representatives from Minnesota
19th-century American lawyers